In geometry, an  antiprism or  is a polyhedron composed of two parallel direct copies (not mirror images) of an  polygon, connected by an alternating band of  triangles. They are represented by the Conway notation .

Antiprisms are a subclass of prismatoids, and are a (degenerate) type of snub polyhedron. 

Antiprisms are similar to prisms, except that the bases are twisted relatively to each other, and that the side faces (connecting the bases) are  triangles, rather than  quadrilaterals.

The dual polyhedron of an -gonal antiprism is an -gonal trapezohedron.

History 
At the intersection of modern-day graph theory and coding theory, the triangulation of a set of points have interested mathematicians since Isaac Newton, who fruitlessly sought a mathematical proof of the kissing number problem in 1694. The existence of antiprisms was discussed, and their name was coined by Johannes Kepler, though it is possible that they were previously known to Archimedes, as they satisfy the same conditions on faces and on vertices as the Archimedean solids. According to Ericson and Zinoviev, Harold Scott MacDonald Coxeter wrote at length on the topic, and was among the first to apply the mathematics of Victor Schlegel to this field.

Knowledge in this field is "quite incomplete" and "was obtained fairly recently", i.e. in the 20th century. For example, as of 2001 it had been proven for only a limited number of non-trivial cases that the -gonal antiprism is the mathematically optimal arrangement of  points in the sense of maximizing the minimum Euclidean distance between any two points on the set: in 1943 by László Fejes Tóth for 4 and 6 points (digonal and trigonal antiprisms, which are Platonic solids); in 1951 by Kurt Schütte and Bartel Leendert van der Waerden for 8 points (tetragonal antiprism, which is not a cube).

The chemical structure of binary compounds has been remarked to be in the family of antiprisms; especially those of the family of boron hydrides (in 1975) and carboranes because they are isoelectronic. This is a mathematically real conclusion reached by studies of X-ray diffraction patterns, and stems from the 1971 work of Kenneth Wade, the nominative source for Wade's rules of polyhedral skeletal electron pair theory.

Rare-earth metals such as the lanthanides form antiprismatic compounds with some of the halides or some of the iodides. The study of crystallography is useful here. Some lanthanides, when arranged in peculiar antiprismatic structures with chlorine and water, can form molecule-based magnets.

Right antiprism 
For an antiprism with regular -gon bases, one usually considers the case where these two copies are twisted by an angle of  degrees.

The axis of a regular polygon is the line perpendicular to the polygon plane and lying in the polygon centre.

For an antiprism with congruent regular -gon bases, twisted by an angle of  degrees, more regularity is obtained if the bases have the same axis: are coaxial; i.e. (for non-coplanar bases): if the line connecting the base centers is perpendicular to the base planes. Then the antiprism is called a right antiprism, and its  side faces are isosceles triangles.

Uniform antiprism 
A uniform -antiprism has two congruent regular -gons as base faces, and  equilateral triangles as side faces.

Uniform antiprisms form an infinite class of vertex-transitive polyhedra, as do uniform prisms.

Schlegel diagrams

Cartesian coordinates 
Cartesian coordinates for the vertices of a right -antiprism (i.e. with regular -gon bases and  isosceles triangle side faces) are:

where ;

if the -antiprism is uniform (i.e. if the triangles are equilateral), then:

Volume and surface area 
Let  be the edge-length of a uniform -gonal antiprism; then the volume is:

and the surface area is:

Related polyhedra 
There are an infinite set of truncated antiprisms, including a lower-symmetry form of the truncated octahedron (truncated triangular antiprism). These can be alternated to create snub antiprisms, two of which are Johnson solids, and the snub triangular antiprism is a lower symmetry form of the regular icosahedron.

Four-dimensional antiprisms can be defined as having two dual polyhedra as parallel opposite faces, so that each three-dimensional face between them comes from two dual parts of the polyhedra: a vertex and a dual polygon, or two dual edges. Every three-dimensional polyhedron is combinatorially equivalent to one of the two opposite faces of a four-dimensional antiprism, constructed from its canonical polyhedron and its polar dual. However, there exist four-dimensional polyhedra that cannot be combined with their duals to form five-dimensional antiprisms.

Symmetry 

The symmetry group contains inversion if and only if  is odd.

Star antiprism 

Uniform star antiprisms are named by their star polygon bases, {p/q}, and exist in prograde and in retrograde (crossed) solutions. Crossed forms have intersecting vertex figures, and are denoted by "inverted" fractions: p/(p – q) instead of p/q; example: 5/3 instead of 5/2.

A right star antiprism has two congruent coaxial regular convex or star polygon base faces, and 2n isosceles triangle side faces.

Any star antiprism with regular convex or star polygon bases can be made a right star antiprism (by translating and/or twisting one of its bases, if necessary).

In the retrograde forms but not in the prograde forms, the triangles joining the convex or star bases intersect the axis of rotational symmetry. Thus:

Retrograde star antiprisms with regular convex polygon bases cannot have all equal edge lengths, so cannot be uniform. "Exception": a retrograde star antiprism with equilateral triangle bases (vertex configuration: 3.3/2.3.3) can be uniform; but then, it has the appearance of an equilateral triangle: it is a degenerate star polyhedron.

Similarly, some retrograde star antiprisms with regular star polygon bases cannot have all equal edge lengths, so cannot be uniform. Example: a retrograde star antiprism with regular star 7/5-gon bases (vertex configuration: 3.3.3.7/5) cannot be uniform.

Also, star antiprism compounds with regular star p/q-gon bases can be constructed if p and q have common factors. Example: a star 10/4-antiprism is the compound of two star 5/2-antiprisms.

See also 
Apeirogonal antiprism
Grand antiprism – a four-dimensional polytope
One World Trade Center, a building consisting primarily of an elongated square antiprism
Skew polygon

References

Bibliography 
 Chapter 2: Archimedean polyhedra, prisms and antiprisms

External links 

Nonconvex Prisms and Antiprisms
Paper models of prisms and antiprisms

Uniform polyhedra
Prismatoid polyhedra
Topological graph theory
Graph drawing
Coxeter groups
Elementary geometry
Polyhedra
Polytopes
Triangulation (geometry)
Knot invariants